Shiladitya DasSarma (born November 11, 1957) is a molecular biologist well-known for contributions to the biology of halophilic and extremophilic microorganisms. He is a Professor in the University of Maryland Baltimore. He earned a PhD degree in Biochemistry from the Massachusetts Institute of Technology and a BS degree in Chemistry from Indiana University Bloomington. Prior to taking a faculty position, he conducted research at the Massachusetts General Hospital, Harvard Medical School, and Pasteur Institute, Paris.

DasSarma has served on the faculty of the University of Massachusetts Amherst (1986-2001), University of Maryland Biotechnology Institute (2001-2010), and University of Maryland School of Medicine, Institute of Marine and Environmental Technology (2010–present). He is a researcher and teacher of molecular genetics, genomics, and bioinformatics and mentor of undergraduate, graduate and postdoctoral students, and junior faculty. He is widely known to have been instrumental in the foundation of the fields of halophile and extremophile research.

Research

Halophiles 
In early work (1980's), he discovered mobile genetic elements in halophilic Archaea, while a graduate student with H. Gobind Khorana (Nobel laureate) and Uttam L. RajBhandary at MIT. He also showed that transcriptional promoters in Archaea  were different from those in common Bacteria, which contributed to the acceptance of the three Domain view of evolution proposed by Carl Woese.

In the 1990s, he organized and led the team that deciphered the first genome sequence and genetic code for a halophilic microbe, Halobacterium sp. NRC-1. This work showed that its proteins are highly acidic, providing an understanding of how proteins may function in high salinity and low water activity conditions. The genome sequence helped to further establish the validity of the Archaea through the finding of similarities to higher eukaryotic organisms and differences from Bacteria. 

Later in the 2000s, his work also suggested that certain genes are acquired through horizontal gene transfers, such as the genes for aerobic respiration. Post-genomic research in his laboratory established the core and signature proteins in halophilic Archaea, and the function of many genes and genetic elements, including multiple replication origins, general transcription factors, and DNA repair systems.

Astrobiology 
DasSarma's recent research (2010's) on an Antarctic halophilic microorganism, Halorubrum lacusprofundi, resulted in further refinement in understanding of protein function in a combination of high salinity and cold conditions. Such studies may explain how life could adapt to new environments, including extraterrestrial environments.

DasSarma proposed that retinal pigments originally discovered in halophilic Archaea may have predated chlorophyll pigments in the early earth, named the "Purple Earth" hypothesis. This proposal provides a potential new biosignature for remote detection of life.

Biotechnology 
DasSarma's laboratory has been instrumental in the study of buoyant gas vesicle nanoparticles (GVNPs) in Halobacterium sp. NRC-1, and developed an expression system to bioengineer GVNPs for biotechnology applications.  These nanoparticles may represent a valuable platform for antigen delivery, vaccine development, and other biomedical and environmental applications

References

External links 
 Halophiles Manual Cold Spring Harbor http://www.worldcat.org/title/halophiles/oclc/33850503 
 Halophiles, eLS http://www.els.net/WileyCDA/ElsArticle/refId-a0000394.html
 CBS Story http://baltimore.cbslocal.com/2013/03/14/researchers-study-survival-secrets-of-mars/
 Baltimore Sun Story http://www.baltimoresun.com/health/maryland-health/bs-hs-salt-vaccine-20120621-story.html
 Haloarchaeal Genomes Website http://halo.umbc.edu/

1957 births
Living people
Indian emigrants to the United States
Indian molecular biologists
Indiana University Bloomington alumni
Massachusetts Institute of Technology School of Science alumni
University of Massachusetts Amherst faculty
University of Maryland, Baltimore faculty
Scientists from Kolkata
20th-century Indian biologists
Indian bioengineers